Three vessels of the Royal Navy have borne the name HMS Coureur, or HMS Coureuse, after the French for "runner" (masculine and feminine, respectively):

Coureur
  was a French lugger that Jacques and Daniel Denys built at Dunkirk and launched on 8 May 1776. , under the command of Lieutenant William George Fairfax, engaged and captured her on 17 June 1778, in advance of the declaration of war. In the engagement Coureur, under the command of Enseigne de Rosily, had five men killed and seven wounded out of her crew of 50. Alert had four men wounded, two mortally. The British took Coureur into the Royal Navy under her existing name. She was under the command of Lieutenant Christopher Major on 21 June 1780 when two American privateers, the Fortune and the Griffin, captured her outside Bonavista Bay after an action that cost her three men killed and four wounded.
  was a French navy corvette, lent to merchants to serve as a privateer of the same name but under the command of French naval officers. In November 1793 she was on a mission to Île de France under Lieutenant de vaisseaux Garaud. At the time of her capture, Coureur was armed with 24 guns and had a crew of 150 men. The Royal Navy named and registered her on 1 June, but never commissioned her. She was put up for sale as "Coureur 355 tons burthen" in August 1801, and sold at Plymouth for £1,400 on 14 September.

Coureuse
  was a schooner launched in 1785 or 1788 in the United States that the French acquired and armed at Lorient in 1794.  captured her in 1795. Coureuse was sold in April 1799.

Citations and references
Citations

References
 
 Demerliac, Alain (1996) La Marine De Louis XVI: Nomenclature Des Navires Français De 1774 À 1792. (Nice: Éditions OMEGA). 
 Fonds Marine. Campagnes (opérations ; divisions et stations navales ; missions diverses). Inventaire de la sous-série Marine BB4. Tome premier : BB4 1 à 209 (1790-1804) 
 
 

Royal Navy ship names
Captured ships
Ships built in France